USS Hawes (FFG-53) is a later model  guided missile frigate. She is named for Rear admiral Richard E. Hawes (1894–1968) who was twice decorated with the Navy Cross for submarine salvage operations.

Construction

The contract to build Hawes was awarded to Bath Iron Works, Bath, Maine, 22 May 1981, and her keel was laid 26 August 1983.  She was launched 18 February 1984; sponsored by Mrs. Ruth H. Watson, widow of the late Rear Adm. Hawes; delivered 1 February 1985, and commissioned 9 February 1985, Commander Thomas F. Madden in command.

Service history

Two al-Qaeda terrorists brought an inflatable Zodiac-type speedboat that carried a bomb alongside guided missile destroyer Cole, while the ship refueled, and detonated their lethal cargo, killing 17 sailors and wounding 42 more. The crewmember's heroic damage control efforts saved Cole. Hawes, Cmdr. The Navy subsequently enhanced global force protection training during crucial transits, and sailors qualified to fire M60 and Browning .50 caliber M2 machine guns to defend against assaults by low-slow flying aircraft and small boats.

Hawes, with Helicopter Antisubmarine Squadron (Light) HSL-48 Detachment 10 embarked, returned from a counter-narcotics deployment to the Caribbean and Western Atlantic to Naval Station Norfolk, Virginia, on 7 October 2009. The ship's operations resulted in the seizure of 200 barrels of cocaine.

In July 2010, Hawes docked for five days at Pier 4 of the Charlestown Navy Yard, participating in a Navy Week coordinated alongside Boston's Harborfest.

Hawes, operating with Destroyer Squadron 26 out of Norfolk, was decommissioned on 10 December 2010. She is moored, pending disposal, at the Naval Sea Systems Command (NavSea) Inactive Ships On-Site Maintenance Office, Philadelphia, Pennsylvania.

References

External links 

 

 navysite.de: USS Hawes
Boothbay Register story, 24 June 1999
MaritimeQuest USS Hawes FFG-53 pages
USS Hawes Decommissioning story 12/11/2010 

 

1984 ships
Gulf War ships of the United States
Oliver Hazard Perry-class frigates of the United States Navy
Ships built in Bath, Maine